The Pittsburgh Maulers are a professional American football team based in Pittsburgh, Pennsylvania. The Maulers compete in the United States Football League (USFL) North division. Founded in 2021, the Maulers are one of the eight inaugural teams for the re-launch of the original United States Football League, which ceased operations in 1986.

They currently play their home games at Tom Benson Hall of Fame Stadium in Canton, Ohio, which also hosts the Pro Football Hall of Fame Game. Prior to Tom Benson Hall of Fame Stadium, the Maulers had played their home games in Protective Stadium and at Legion Field.

History 

The Pittsburgh Maulers were one of eight teams that were officially announced as a USFL franchise on The Herd with Colin Cowherd on November 22, 2021, Their first head coach was announced on January 20, 2022, when it was announced on The Herd with Colin Cowherd that former NFL running backs coach Kirby Wilson was named the Head Coach and General Manager of the Maulers. Wilson revealed on February 9, 2022, that UConn Defensive Coordinator Jarren Horton would become the Defensive Coordinator for the Maulers, while Wilson would call the offense. They made their first draft pick in franchise history, selecting quarterback Kyle Lauletta 7th overall. They drafted 35 players from February 22–23 in 2022.

The team begun the season 0–4, the worst in the league, but defeated the Houston Gamblers 21–20 behind an off the bench effort by newly signed quarterback Vad Lee. Finishing with a record of 1–9, the worst record in the league, the team did not win the rights to the first overall pick in the 2023 USFL Draft, after the league decided that the winner of the Week 10 game between the 1–8 Maulers and 1–8 Michigan Panthers, would win the first overall pick. The Panthers were victorious 21–33.

On October 18, 2022, the Maulers named Lonnie Young as the team's new general manager. In early January, 2023, Wilson stepped down as the head coach of the Maulers, citing personal reasons. He was replaced on January 17, 2023 by Ray Horton.

Logo and Uniforms
The team's 2022 colors of orange and purple were slightly different from what was used by the Pittsburgh Maulers team in the original USFL, as they used red and purple. In any event, the colors were a radical departure from the city's traditional sporting colors of black and gold and are more or less of an ode to the original Maulers franchise.

The logo depicts a worker swinging a large hammer, as an ode to the steel workers that Pittsburgh's history is known for. The current jerseys were a different design than the originals, with the home being purple with an orange bar across the shoulders and the away being white with a purple bar along the shoulders.

In 2023, the Maulers changed their teams colors to the traditional city colors of black, gold, and white.

Personnel

Current roster
Initially, each team carried a 38-man active roster and a 7-man practice squad, but the rosters were increased to 40 active players and 50 total in May, 2022.

Staff

Statistics and records

Season-by-season record

Note: The Finish, Wins, Losses, and Ties columns list regular season results and exclude any postseason play.

Records

References

External links
 Pittsburgh Maulers official website

2021 establishments in Alabama
American football teams established in 2021
Pittsburgh Maulers (2022)
American football teams in Pittsburgh
United States Football League (2022) teams